Several types of valve connections for propane, butane, and LPG containers exist for transport and storage, sometimes with overlapping usage and applications, and there are major differences in usage between different countries. Even within a single country more than one type can be in use for a specific application. This requires adequate tooling and adapters for replenishment in multiple countries. For example for overlanders and users of autogas traveling with a container originating in one country to other parts of the world this is a major concern. This article describes existing standards and the standards in use for a number of countries. For disposable containers the availability per country is described. Filling stations may be able and allowed to fill foreign containers if adequate adapters  are available. Adapters are provided by, amongst others, camping stores. The iOverlander database maintained by travelers, My LPG and the Facebook group "Cooking Gas Around the World" provide more information about individual sources per country. Much general information about global LPG use and standardization is available from the World LPG Association and the AEGPL

Container types
The main containers of  liquefied petroleum gas, propane and butane are automotive tanks, disposable cylinders, permanent tanks and portable cylinders.

Connector types and standards
The list of standards shows one applicable standard for each connector type listed in the table below. A single applicable standard has been chosen in case multiple versions of the same standard have been published, for example a German and a European version.

Overview of standards

List of connector types
The Connector Types Table lists connectors that are found on propane, butane and LPG containers, the standards these connectors adhere to as well as the most important parameters of these connectors.

Gallery of threaded connectors

Gallery of quick coupling connectors

Standards in use per country
The list of standards in use per country shows per country for each application which connectors are use. In some countries multiple connectors are used for the same application.

References

Fuel gas
Automotive standards